Tomoxia similaris is a species of beetle in the genus Tomoxia of the family Mordellidae. It was described by Nomura in 1967.

References

Beetles described in 1967
Tomoxia